Emporis was a real estate data mining company that was headquartered in Hamburg, Germany. The company collected data and photographs of buildings worldwide, which were published in an online database from 2000 to September 2022.

On 12 September 2022, the managing director of CoStar Europe posted a letter on Emporis.com, informing its community members of the decision which had been made to retire the Emporis community platform, effective 13 September 2022.

Emporis offered a variety of information on its public database, Emporis.com. Emporis was frequently cited by various media sources as an authority on building data.

Emporis originally focused exclusively on high-rise buildings and skyscrapers, which it defined as buildings "between 35 and 100 metres" tall and "at least 100 metres tall", respectively. Emporis used the point where the building touches the ground to determine height. The database had expanded to include low-rise buildings and other structures. It used a point system to rank skylines.

History
Michael Wutzke started a website about skyscrapers in Frankfurt in 1996. In 2000 he started skyscrapers.com, which was folded into Emporis in 2003.

In 2004, Stephan R. Boehm assumed the role of chairman. Wutzke was Chief Technology Officer and managing director until 2010, when he left the company. Since then, Daniel Grözinger and Sven Schmidt are managing directors at Emporis

In 2005 Emporis formed a partnership with the Council on Tall Buildings and Urban Habitat (CTBUH), under which Emporis served as the official CTBUH high-rise buildings database until the launch of The Skyscraper Center in 2011.

In 2007 venture capital firm Neuhaus Partners and KfW Bankengruppe invested several million euro in the company. Effective 1 January 2009, the company moved its headquarters from Darmstadt to Frankfurt. In 2011, the company moved from Frankfurt to Hamburg.

On 26 October 2020, CoStar Group, Inc., based in Washington, D.C., completed its acquisition of Emporis GmbH. CoStar Group added Emporis to its portfolio of brands. The other brands included LoopNet, Apartments.com, Apartment Finder, Belbex, amongst several others.

The merger of Emporis GmbH into CoStar Group subsidiary STR, Inc's German division, STR Germany GmbH, was finalized on 27 January 2021, with Emporis GmbH's removal from the Common Register Portal of the German Federal States 

On 14 September 2022, the entirety of the Emporis website's original content, including the building database, articles and data regarding Emporis Skyscraper Award recipients, and corporate information, was removed.

Emporis Skyscraper Award

In 2000 a group of Emporis senior editors began presenting the Emporis Skyscraper Award. Eligible buildings are selected from a list of all buildings in the world at least 100 meters tall which were completed that year.

See also
SkyscraperCity
SkyscraperPage
Structurae
Council on Tall Buildings and Urban Habitat

References

External links

Companies based in Hamburg
Architecture websites
German real estate websites
Defunct websites
Internet properties disestablished in 2022
Internet properties established in 2000
Internet properties established in 1996